Benjamin Michael Utt (born June 13, 1959 in Richmond, California) is a former American football guard who played eight seasons in the National Football League for the Baltimore/Indianapolis Colts.

Married to Elizabeth Utt and father to two children: Garrett and Olivia. Garrett played Division 1 football from 2007 to 2008 at Duke University, while Olivia plays volleyball for Tulane University.

References

Indianapolis Colts players
Georgia Tech Yellow Jackets football players
1959 births
Living people
American football offensive linemen
Baltimore Colts players
Ed Block Courage Award recipients